The 1918 Navy Midshipmen football team represented the United States Naval Academy during the 1918 college football season. In their second season under head coach Gil Dobie, the Midshipmen compiled a 4–1 record, shut out two opponents, and outscored all opponents by a combined score of 283 to 20.

The annual Army–Navy Game was not played during the 1918 season due to World War I.

Schedule

References

Navy
Navy Midshipmen football seasons
Navy Midshipmen football